David Dempsey (born 27 May 1955) is a New Zealand cricketer. He played in 32 first-class and 25 List A matches for Canterbury from 1979 to 1988.

See also
 List of Canterbury representative cricketers

References

External links
 

1955 births
Living people
New Zealand cricketers
Canterbury cricketers
Cricketers from Christchurch
South Island cricketers